Chaghatayi (also Romanized as Chāghātāyī) is a village in Qilab Rural District, Alvar-e Garmsiri District, Andimeshk County, Khuzestan Province, Iran. At the 2006 census, its population was 19, in 4 families.

References 

Populated places in Andimeshk County